The 2018 Gulf Coast Premier League season was the 3rd season of the GCPL.

Changes from 2017

Incoming teams

Moved and/or Rebranded teams

Outgoing teams

Standings

Central Division

East Division

West Division

Playoffs

References

Gulf Coast Premier League